SM U-20 or U-XX was the lead boat of the  of submarines or U-boats built for and operated by the Austro-Hungarian Navy ( or ) during the First World War. The design for U-20 was based on that of the submarines of the Royal Danish Navy's Havmanden class (which had been designed by Whitehead & Co. in Fiume), and was largely obsolete by the beginning of the war.

U-20 had no wartime successes and was sunk in early July 1918 by the Italian submarine F-12. The wreck of U-20 was located in 1962 and salvaged. A portion of her conning tower is on display in a military museum in Vienna.

Design and construction 
When it became apparent to the Austro-Hungarian Navy that the First World War would not be a short war, they moved to bolster their U-boat fleet by seizing the plans for Denmark's Havmanden class submarines, which had been designed by Whitehead & Co. in Fiume, who had built three units. Although the Austro-Hungarian Navy was not happy with the design, which was largely obsolete, it was the only design for which plans were available and which could be begun immediately in domestic shipyards. The Austro-Hungarian Navy unenthusiastically placed orders for U-20 and her three sister boats on 27 March 1915.

U-20 was one of two boats of the class to be built at the Pola Navy Yard. Due to demands by the Hungarian government, subcontracts for the class were divided between Hungarian and Austrian firms, but this politically expedient solution worsened technical problems with the design and resulted in numerous modifications and delays for the class in general.

U-20 was a coastal submarine that displaced  surfaced and  submerged and was designed for a complement of 18. For propulsion, she featured a single propeller shaft, a single  diesel engine for surface running, and a single  electric motor for submerged travel. She was capable of  while surfaced and  while submerged.

U-20 was armed with two  torpedo tubes located in the front and carried a complement of two torpedoes. She was also equipped with a  deck gun and an  machine gun.

U-20 was laid down on 29 September 1915, six months after she was ordered, and was launched on 18 September 1916.

Service career 

Upon completion, U-20 began diving trials. The collision with the Austro-Hungarian light cruiser twisted U-20s periscope, extensively damaged the conning tower, and knocked off her deck gun. After seven months of reconstruction, U-20 was commissioned into the Austro-Hungarian Navy on 20 October.

After initially operating out of Pola, U-20 was transferred to Trieste in February 1918. Over the next three months, the U-boat patrolled in the northern Adriatic  between the Tagliamento estuary and Venice. U-20 had an encounter with an enemy submarine on 7 April but was not able to successfully launch an attack.
On 3 July, Linienschiffsleutnant Ludwig Müller sailed U-20 out from Trieste for the Gulf of Venice. A day later, U-20 was spotted by the Italian submarine F-12, which was on patrol in the northern Adriatic. F-12 initially pursued U-20 underwater, and then on the surface. There was no wreckage on the surface, only an oil slick. Like all of her sister boats, U-20 had no wartime successes.

In mid 1962, the wreck of U-20 was discovered in the northern Adriatic. Italian salvage crews raised the boat's rear portion on 22 July and her front section on 21 November. The conning tower and a small midships section of U-20 were donated to the Heeresgeschichtliches Museum in Vienna, where they are on display, while the rest of the boat was scrapped. The remains of the crewmen were buried on the grounds of the Theresian Military Academy at Wiener Neustadt.

Notes

References

Bibliography 

 
 
 
 
 

U-20-class submarines
U-boats commissioned in 1917
Maritime incidents in 1918
U-boats sunk in 1918
World War I shipwrecks in the Adriatic Sea
Ships sunk by Italian submarines
U-boats sunk by Italian warships
1916 ships
Ships built in Pola
World War I submarines of Austria-Hungary
Ships lost with all hands